Standring is a surname. Notable people with the surname include:

 Chris Standring (born 1960), British jazz guitarist
 Glenn Standring, New Zealand scriptwriter
 Heather Standring (born 1928), British illustrator
 Keith Standring (born 1965), English cricketer
 Kenneth Standring (born 1935), English cricketer
 Susan Standring, British neuroscientist

See also
Standring Inlet, an inlet of Graham Land, Antarctica